The FSC Lublin Automotive Factory commonly known as FSC, is a large motor vehicle factory in Poland established while the country was part of the Soviet Bloc. It was founded in 1950. The first vehicle left its assembly line on November 7, 1951. The factory was built on an open field in Lublin from the grounds up, to first produce light trucks and later vans, as well as vehicles for the military.

History 

After the 1989 collapse of the communist system in Poland, and the establishment of a free market economy, the state-owned FSC factory began to establish links with companies outside Poland. In 1995 the factory entered a joint venture with the South Korean conglomerate Daewoo. It soon become a part of the new company Daewoo Motor Polska. In December 1995 the factory started assembling Daewoo Nexia passenger cars. Around 40,000 were produced before production ended in 1998. Daewoo also began a joint project with British manufacturer LDV to develop a new van.

Daewoo also produced the Lublin van and the Honker military vehicle.

Daewoo experienced serious financial problems following the financial crisis in Asia, which brought serious difficulties to the Lublin factory. Daewoo Motor Polska entered bankruptcy in October 2001 and all production in the Lublin factory came to a halt. LDV bought Daewoo's share in the van project and moved the tooling to its factory in Birmingham, putting it into production in 2005 as the Maxus.

In 2003, the FSC factory was bought by Intrall, a British investment group, and production of the Lublin van resumed.

Current product
Lublin van/Honker Cargo (1993–2007, 2011–2016)

Former products
From 1963 to 1970 the company manufactured (together with a factory in Czechoslovakia) the armoured personnel carrier OT-64 SKOT. Around 4,500 were produced for the Polish and Czechoslovak armies as well as export customers.

Some of the vehicles produced at the factory:
FSC Lublin-51 (1951–1959)
FSC Żuk (1959–1998)
Lubo (2006 prototype)
Peugeot 405 (1993-1995)
Daewoo Nexia (1995–1998)
Honker 4×4 (1996–2016)

Notes and references

External links
 Official page FS Honker

Car manufacturers of Poland
1950 establishments in Poland
Vehicle manufacturing companies established in 1950
Truck manufacturers of Poland
Defunct manufacturing companies of Poland